The 1987 Speedway World Team Cup was the 28th edition of the FIM Speedway World Team Cup to determine the team world champions.

Denmark won two legs and therefore won their fifth consecutive title (and seventh in total) moving to just one title win if England's record 8. It was also Hans Nielsen's seventh gold medal having taken part in all of Denmark's title wins.

Group 4
Calendar

 Winner promoted to Group C in 1988

Round 1

 June 19, 1987
  Amsterdam

Round 2

 September 13, 1987
  Skien

Round 3

 September 27, 1987
  Ljubljana

Round 4

 October 3, 1987
  Shumen

Group 3
Calendar

 Winner promoted to Group B in 1988 ; 4th relegated to Group D in 1988

Round 1

 May 3, 1987
  Lonigo

Round 2

 June 21, 1987
  Wiener Neustadt

Round 3

 July 11, 1987
  Landshut

Round 4

 September 13, 1987
  Miskolc

Group 2
Calendar

 Winner promoted to Group A in 1988 ; 4th relegated to Group C in 1988

Round 1

 July 19, 1987
  Gdańsk

Round 2

 August 21, 1987
  Linköping

Round 3

 September 13, 1987
  Rybnik

Group 1 (FINAL GROUP)

Calendar

 4th relegated to Group B in 1988

Round 1
 August 16, 1987
  Fredericia, Fredericia Speedway Center
 Att: 5,000
 Ref: Christer Bergstrom (Sw)

Round 2
 August 25, 1987
  Coventry, Brandon Stadium
 Ref: Graham Brodie (Eng)

Round 3
 September 13, 1987
  Prague, Marketa Stadium
 Att: 12,000

Final standings

See also
 1987 Individual Speedway World Championship
 1987 Speedway World Pairs Championship

References

Speedway World Team Cup
1987 in speedway